The Cadillac XLR is a front-engine, rear-drive, two passenger roadster manufactured and marketed by Cadillac from 2003 to 2009 across a single generation — and noted for its power retractable hardtop, Bulgari designed interior instruments, head-up display, adaptive suspension marketed as Magnetic Ride Control, rear-mounted transmission and near 50/50 front-to-rear weight distribution. As Cadillac's flagship model, the XLR was introduced at the 2003 North American International Auto Show and began production with model year 2004 — foreshadowed by the 1999 Evoq concept.

Sharing the GM Y platform and manufactured alongside the Chevrolet Corvette in Bowling Green, Kentucky, the two cars also share hydroformed perimeter frame and composite bodywork construction — though each have unique exterior and interior styling, suspension settings and engine. The XLR was the first production Cadillac with radar-based adaptive cruise control (ACC) and the first to offer both heated and cooled seats.

The XLR was nominated for the North American Car of the Year award for 2004.

Design
The Cadillac XLR was marketed as a luxury roadster and offered numerous features either as standard equipment or as options, including a touchscreen GPS navigation radio with an AM/FM radio, CD changer, XM Satellite Radio, full voice control, and a full Bose premium amplified audio system, adaptive cruise control, Bulgari-branded instrument panel cluster, OnStar, High Intensity Discharge (HID) front headlamps, perforated luxury leather-trimmed seating surfaces with power-adjustable, heated and cooled bucket seats with a driver's memory system, luxury carpeted floor mats with embroidered 'XLR' logos, premium aluminum-alloy wheels, and wood interior trim.

The XLR's featured adaptive suspension with magneto-rheological shock absorber fluid for enhanced ride control. The system uses four wheel-to-body displacement sensors to measure wheel motion over the road surface and responds by adjusting the shock damping almost instantly. The shock absorbers are filled with a fluid that contains suspended iron particles that respond to magnetic signals. The system responds by constantly monitoring motion and changing the damping forces at all four corners of the vehicle — to modulate body motion during aggressive maneuvers or on uneven road surfaces.

Where the Chevrolet Corvette (C6) was powered by a 6.0L LS2 V8 engine and offered a six-speed manual transmission, the XLR featured Cadillac's 4.6L Northstar V8 (supercharged in the XLR-V) and either a five-speed 5L50 automatic transmission, or a six-speed 6L80 automatic transmission. It produced 320 hp and 310 lb·ft of torque in the standard trim. Optional XLR equipment included polished aluminum-alloy wheels, exterior and interior color options, and different interior trim options.

The XLR featured the traditional Cadillac, silver-painted upper "Egg Crate" (XLR) or chrome wire mesh (XLR-V) front grille, which had a similar appearance to gravel shields commonly installed on cars during the 1930s. Other standard items included angular front High Intensity Discharge (HID) front head lamps, vertical rear tail lamps, and chrome exterior details. Inside, the XLR featured wood interior trim in addition to the C6 Corvette's aluminum trim, and different seats.

For model year 2009, the XLR added a new front fascia, new rear fascia, and chrome side fender vents. Inside, Alcantara - a suede-like microfiber material - was added for the headliner. The interior added new instrument cluster trim rings with revised graphics, (removal of the Bulgari logo) and new wood dashboard trims. XLR production ended on March 31, 2009.

The base price of the XLR in the United States went from $75,385 ($ in  dollars) at launch to $86,215 ($ in  dollars) by the end of its run in 2009.

XLR-V

The Cadillac XLR-V, was a high-performance variant of the XLR and part of the first-generation V-Series, with a total . Cadillac gave the public its first glimpse of the supercharged XLR-V in its Super Bowl commercial, which aired February 6, 2005. Super Bowl MVP Deion Branch was also awarded an XLR. The car was formally introduced at the 2005 New York International Auto Show. Contrary to popular belief, it was not intended to compete with the BMW M6 or the Mercedes-Benz AMG SL-Class.

The XLR-V used the same supercharged Northstar V8 as the STS-V, though output was down somewhat. The supercharger and four intercooler cores were built into the intake manifold. A six-speed automatic transmission, larger brakes from the Z51 Corvette, and 19-inch wheels were used.

The base price of the XLR-V in the United States went from $97,485 ($ in  dollars) at launch to $104,215 ($ in  dollars) by the end of its run in 2009.

Sales 
The XLR had sales projections of 5,000 to 7,000 per year.

See also 

 Cadillac V series
 Chevrolet Corvette (C6)
 Cadillac Northstar engine series

References

Notes

Bibliography

External links

Cadillac XLR Net

XLR
Hardtop convertibles
Flagship vehicles
Roadsters
Rear-wheel-drive vehicles
Cars introduced in 2003
Motor vehicles manufactured in the United States